Lance Lorenzo Laing (born 28 February 1988) is a Jamaican retired footballer.

Career

Professional
Laing began his career in his native Jamaica, playing for Harbour View and Village United in the top flight Jamaica National Premier League. He was part of the Harbour View team which won JNPL titles in 2007 and 2010, and played in the 2007 CFU Club Championship, the 2008 CONCACAF Champions' Cup and the 2008-09 CONCACAF Champions League.

Laing moved to the United States in 2011 when he signed with the Fort Lauderdale Strikers of the North American Soccer League. He made his debut for the Strikers on 29 April, in a 2–2 tie with the Puerto Rico Islanders. He scored his first goal with the club against Montreal Impact on 13 July 2011. Following an impressive debut season with the Strikers, Laing was named to the NASL Best XI for the 2011 season. After the 2011 season, Laing spent some time on trial with both the Columbus Crew and Real Salt Lake of Major League Soccer. Laing scored his second goal with the Strikers, and his first of the 2012 season, off of a freekick in the 3–3 draw against the Carolina RailHawks on 2 May 2012.

On 21 November 2012 FC Edmonton announced that Laing would be joining the team ahead of the 2013 season.

Laing was named FC Edmonton's MVP by supporter group ESG in 2013.

In 2014, following a mid-season move from fullback to midfield, Laing led the Eddies in goals (7) and assists (6).  He was twice named NASL Player of the Week including after scoring an 'Olimpico' goal in a 2–0 victory over Ottawa Fury FC. As a result of his fine season, Laing was awarded a contract extension and named MVP by ESG for a second straight year. He was also named to the NASL's Best XI, as voted on by each of the league's 10 head coaches, for the second time in his career.

In 2015, Laing only played 20 games for FC Edmonton as a result of international duty, but still managed 8 goals and 7 assists.  The Eddies won just one of the 10 games that Laing missed while representing Jamaica.  Following the season, it was reported that Laing would not return to FC Edmonton. On 15 December 2015, it was announced that Laing had signed with Minnesota United FC.

Laing signed with FC Cincinnati of the USL for the 2018 season on 19 December 2017

On 23 August 2018 Laing was loaned from FC Cincinnati to San Antonio FC for the remainder of the 2018 season.

International
Laing represented Jamaica several times at the under 17 level between 2004 and 2005, and made his debut for the senior national team on 26 July 2008 in an international friendly against El Salvador.
As a result of his performances with the Strikers, on 14 May 2012, Laing was recalled to the national team.

In 2015, Laing was recalled to Jamaica's national team for the 2015 Copa America in Chile. He appeared in Jamaica's three group-stage matches, including a start against Argentina on 20 June 2015. Jamaica lost all three matches 1-0 and were eliminated from the tournament.

Laing was also named to Jamaica's roster for the 2015 Gold Cup and appeared in a 1–0 win over Haiti and in a 2–2 tie with Costa Rica.  Laing did not appear in Jamaica's historic 2-1 semi-final win over the USA nor in its 3–1 loss to Mexico in the final.

Honors

FC Edmonton
North American Soccer League:
 NASL Best XI(2) 2014

Fort Lauderdale Strikers
North American Soccer League:
 Finalist (1) 2011
 NASL Best XI(1) 2011

Harbour View
Jamaica National Premier League:
 Winner (2) 2007, 2010
CFU Club Championship:
 Winner (1): 2007

References

External links
 Fort Lauderdale bio
 

1988 births
Living people
Jamaican footballers
Jamaican expatriate footballers
Jamaica international footballers
Harbour View F.C. players
Fort Lauderdale Strikers players
FC Edmonton players
Minnesota United FC (2010–2016) players
Expatriate soccer players in the United States
Expatriate soccer players in Canada
North American Soccer League players
Jamaican expatriate sportspeople in the United States
Jamaican expatriate sportspeople in Canada
People from Trelawny Parish
Association football fullbacks
2015 Copa América players
2015 CONCACAF Gold Cup players
North Carolina FC players
FC Cincinnati (2016–18) players
San Antonio FC players